David Wedderburn Gibson (born 23 September 1938 in Kirkliston, West Lothian) is a former Scottish footballer, who played for Livingston United, Hibernian, Leicester City, Aston Villa, Exeter City and the Scotland national team.

Considered to be one of the finest and most skilful players in Leicester's history, he was the playmaker and creative force of the great Foxes side of the 1960s under Matt Gillies, including the "Ice Kings" side that fell just short of winning the 'double' in 1962–63. He scored in both legs of Leicester's 1964 League Cup final victory and also played in a further three cup finals for the club.

Gibson earned seven caps and scored three times for Scotland, including a goal against Spain at the Santiago Bernabéu 12 months before Spain became European Champions.

Career

Early career
Gibson, an inside forward, was signed by Hibernian from local junior side Livingston United in 1956. Gibson had grown up as a fan of their Edinburgh derby rivals Hearts, but was offered a better deal by Hibernian. He made his debut for Hibs alongside four of the Famous Five forward line, replacing Bobby Johnstone. After six years with the Edinburgh club he joined English club Leicester City in January 1962 for a fee reported to have been £40,000.

Leicester City
Gibson's joined Leicester while still on national service, so his appearances in 1961–62 season were restricted. He eventually made his debut on 2 March 1962. However, the following season, Gibson began to form a deadly partnership down the left-flank of Leicester's attack with Mike Stringfellow and became a key fixture in the Leicester side as they chased the double with the club sitting top of the league with 5 games to go and reaching the FA Cup Final, though they eventually fell short in both competitions. Gibson then helped Leicester to victory in the 1964 League Cup final scoring a goal in both legs of the final. He also helped Leicester to the 1965 League Cup final and the 1969 FA Cup Final, though they lost on both occasions.

Late career and retirement
He moved to Aston Villa in September 1970 where he remained for two years before ending his career with Exeter City. He retired in 1974.

He later became a postman before running a residential care centre in Whetstone in Leicestershire.

International career
Gibson made his debut for Scotland in a 4–1 victory over Austria in front of 94,500 fans at Hampden Park on 4 May 1963 in a game that was abandoned after 79 minutes after the Austrian team's foul tactics caused referee Jim Finney to abandon the game in fear of player safety. Gibson played well enough to retain his place, in the absence of Spurs player John White, for end of season friendly matches against Norway, Republic of Ireland and Spain. His first international goal came in a famous 6–2 victory against Spain in the Bernabéu Stadium, Madrid.

He earned 7 caps overall, scoring 3 times.

International goals
Scores and results list Scotland's goal tally first.

Honours
Leicester City
 FA Cup runner-up: 1963, 1969
 League Cup winner: 1964
Runner-up: 1965

References

External links
 
 
 Profile and stats at FoxesTalk

1938 births
Living people
Footballers from Edinburgh
Footballers from West Lothian
Association football forwards
Scottish footballers
Scotland international footballers
Hibernian F.C. players
Leicester City F.C. players
Livingston United F.C. players
Aston Villa F.C. players
Exeter City F.C. players
Scottish Junior Football Association players
Scottish Football League players
English Football League players
FA Cup Final players